"Wanted Dead or Alive" is a power ballad by American rock band Bon Jovi. It is from their 1986 album Slippery When Wet. The song was written by Jon Bon Jovi and Richie Sambora and was released on March 3, 1987, as the album's third single. During a February 20, 2008 encore performance in Detroit, Jon Bon Jovi told the crowd about running into Bob Seger at a Pistons game. As he introduced his song "Wanted Dead or Alive", he said it was inspired by Seger's "Turn the Page" hit and called the song the band's anthem. The song peaked at #7 on the Billboard Hot 100 chart and #13 on the Mainstream Rock Tracks chart, making it the third single from the album to reach the Top 10 of the Hot 100. As a result, Slippery When Wet was the first glam metal album to have 3 top 10 hits on the Billboard Hot 100.

In 2001 a live version from the album One Wild Night Live 1985–2001 was released as a single featuring a promotional music video. In 2003 a new version was released on the album This Left Feels Right and this version was also released as a single with a promotional video.

Considered to be one of the band's signature songs, it is the theme song for Discovery Channel's Deadliest Catch TV show. It was also featured in the movies Harley Davidson and the Marlboro Man, Scooby Doo 2: Monsters Unleashed, and Wild Hogs. The song has been used in episodes of It's Always Sunny in Philadelphia, Supernatural, The Sopranos, Miami Vice and The Vampire Diaries.

The song was certified quadruple platinum by the Recording Industry Association of America in 2015.

Background
The song's title pays homage to Jon's admiration for Old West heroes, and how he identifies with them as being hated and loved at the same time ("wanted dead or alive", so to speak). During an interview on Inside the Actors Studio, Jon said he got the inspiration for the song early one morning when he could not sleep while riding in a tour bus. The "lifestyle of every rock band" was similar to that of outlaws in that each was, "a young band of thieves, riding into town, stealing the money, the girls, and the booze before the sun came up."

Jon said during a concert in Detroit, Michigan, on February 20, 2008, that the song "absolutely positively was influenced by [Bob] Seger's 'Turn the Page.'" Bon Jovi performed "Turn the Page" during a concert in Toronto, Ontario on July 21, 2010. Afterward, Jon told the audience he remembered listening to this song in 1985 while traveling on a tour bus in the midwest and telling Richie Sambora, "We got to write a song like this." The following year the duo composed "Wanted Dead or Alive".

Cash Box praised Bon Jovi's "convincing gravel-throated" vocal.

Music video
The music video was directed by Wayne Isham and features footage from the band's Slippery When Wet Tour, including shots from Rochester, New York's War Memorial Auditorium; Chicago's UIC Pavilion; Rochester, Minnesota's Mayo Civic Center; Denver's McNichols Sports Arena; Pittsburgh's Fort Pitt Tunnel and skyline; Huntington, West Virginia; Oklahoma City and other venues. The video captures the life-on-the-road feeling, with several shots of the exhausted band members. The audio for the video uses the short (edited) version of the song.

In Bon Jovi's Slippery When Wet Special Edition, Jon and Richie perform the acoustic version of "Wanted Dead or Alive" live, and before singing they mention they wrote the song in Richie's mother's basement a year ago (1985 or 1986) and Richie says "Mom, this is for you" and Jon thanks her by saying "Thanks for Richie's mom for not doing the laundry the day we wrote this song, it's called 'Wanted Dead or Alive'". In this version, Richie and Jon take turns singing during the second and the last verse. The guitar solo is performed on one of Sambora's trademark multi-neck 12-string Ovation guitars, rather than switching to an electric guitar for the solo and last verse of the song.

Reception
Les Claypool of Primus chose the song for the A.V. Club column "HateSong", where musicians choose songs they dislike. Claypool, who called the song a "wretched soundscape", reflected, "Bon Jovi was actually a big influence on Primus back in the day. Basically, the influence was that we wanted to make music that was the polar opposite of Bon Jovi."

Track listings

Charts

Original version

2000 live version

Year-end charts

Certifications

Accolades

See also
List of glam metal albums and songs

References

External links

1986 songs
1987 singles
Bon Jovi songs
Songs about fame
Song recordings produced by Bruce Fairbairn
Songs written by Jon Bon Jovi
Songs written by Richie Sambora
Music videos directed by Wayne Isham
Black-and-white music videos
Mercury Records singles
Glam metal ballads
1980s ballads